Harry Glenville "Doc" Tonkin (August 11, 1881 – May 30, 1959) was a Major League Baseball pitcher. He pitched in 2.2 innings, and gave up six hits and two earned runs. He also collected 2 hits in 2 at-bats with a run scored for a rare career 1.000 batting average. Tonkin was born in Concord, New Hampshire and died in Miami, Florida.

External links
Baseball Reference.com page

1881 births
1959 deaths
Washington Senators (1901–1960) players
Baseball players from New Hampshire